Tiago Oliveira de Souza (born 5 February 1988), commonly known as Tiago Chulapa, is a Brazilian footballer who plays as a striker for Rayong F.C. in the Thai League 2.

Club career

Youth career
Born and raised in Curitiba, Brazil, Tiago began his career as a football player in 2001 with Paraná Clube. In 2001, he moved to Brazilian top club, São Paulo FC. In 2002, he returned to Paraná Clube where he played till he became 19 years old.

Early career
Tiago began his professional career in Brazil with his parent club, based in his hometown, Curitiba, Paraná Clube in 2007. In his one-year spell at the Curtiba-based club, he helped them achieve the runners-up place in the Campeonato Paranaense. In 2008, he moved to Rio Claro, São Paulo, where he signed a one-year contract with Rio Claro Futebol Clube. He then moved to Pato Branco-based Pato Branco Esporte Clube in 2009 where he helped them win the Campeonato Paranaense Third Level in 2009. In the same year, he moved to Mooca-based Clube Atlético Juventus. In 2010, he moved to Petrópolis-based Serrano Football Club.

Guaçuano
His next move was in 2011 to Clube Atlético Guaçuano. He made his debut for the Mogi Guaçu-based club on 29 January 2012 in a 2-0 win in a Campeonato Paulista Série A3 match against Marília Atlético Clube and scored his first goal on 5 February 2012 in a 2-2 draw against Esporte Clube São Bento. He scored 6 goals in his 21 appearances for the Mogi Guaçu-based club in the 2012 Campeonato Paulista Série A3.

Oeste
In 2012, he moved to Itápolis where he signed a one-year contract with Oeste Futebol Clube. He made his debut and scored his first goal for the Itápolis-based club on 30 June 2012 in a 4-1 loss in a Campeonato Brasileiro Série C match against Vila Nova Futebol Clube helping them win the 2012 Campeonato Brasileiro Série C. He scored 1 goal in his 3 appearances in the 2012 Campeonato Brasileiro Série C.

Bragantino
In the same season, he moved to Bragança Paulista-based Clube Atlético Bragantino. He made his debut for the Bragança Paulista-based club on 19 September 2012 in a 2-0 win in a Campeonato Brasileiro Série B match over América Futebol Clube (MG) and scored his first goal on 29 September 2012 in a 2-1 win over Clube Atlético Paranaense He scored one goal in his 3 appearances for the Bragança Paulista-based club in the 2012 Campeonato Brasileiro Série B.

Treze
In 2013, he moved to Paraíba-based Treze Futebol Clube. He made his debut for the Paraíba-based club on 18 August 2013 in a 2-0 win over his latter club Cuiabá Esporte Clube and scored his first goal on 26 August 2013 in a 4-2 loss against Sampaio Corrêa Futebol Clube. He scored 3 goals in his 12 appearances for the Paraíba-based club in the 2013 Campeonato Brasileiro Série C.

Sorocaba
He then moved to Sorocaba in 2014 where he signed a one-year contract with Clube Atlético Sorocaba. He made his debut for the Sorocaba-based club on 19 January 2014 in a 1-0 loss against one of his former clubs, Rio Claro Futebol Clube. He made 4 appearances for the Sorocaba-based club in the 2014 Campeonato Paulista.

Cuiabá
In the same year, he signed a short-term contract with Cuiabá-based Cuiabá Esporte Clube. He made his debut and scored his first goal for the Cuiabá-based club on 28 April 2014 in a 3-1 win over Clube Recreativo e Atlético Catalano. He also made 2 appearances in the Quarter-finals of the 2014 Copa Verde, one in a 1-0 loss against Brasília FC in the away leg and another in a 0-0 draw in the return leg against the same club. He also made 2 appearances in the First Round of the 2014 Copa do Brasil, one in a 0-0 draw against Barbalha Futebol Clube in the away leg and another in which he also scored a goal in a 2-0 win over the same club in the return leg. The club couldn't progress beyond the Second Round after their 5-2 loss on aggregate to Brazilian top club, Sport Club Internacional. He also helped them win the Campeonato Mato-Grossense in 2014. He scored 2 goal in his 7 appearances for the Cuiabá-based club.

Sur
He first moved out of Brazil in 2014 to the Middle East and more accurately to Oman. On 25 September 2014, he signed a one-year contract with Oman Professional League club, Sur SC.

Al-Seeb
On 5 August 2015, he signed a one-year contract with Oman First Division League club, Al-Seeb.

Club career statistics

Honours

Club
With Paraná
Campeonato Paranaense (0): Runner-up 2007

With Pato Branco
Campeonato Paranaense Third Level (1): 2009

With Oeste
Campeonato Brasileiro Série C (1): 2012

With Cuiabá
Campeonato Mato-Grossense (1): 2014

With Sur
Sultan Qaboos Cup (0): Runner-up 2014–15

Individual
Thai League 2: Top Scorer 2019

References

External links

1988 births
Living people
Footballers from Curitiba
Brazilian footballers
Brazilian expatriate footballers
Association football forwards
Paraná Clube players
Rio Claro Futebol Clube players
Pato Branco Esporte Clube players
Clube Atlético Juventus players
Serrano Football Club players
Oeste Futebol Clube players
Clube Atlético Bragantino players
Treze Futebol Clube players
Clube Atlético Sorocaba players
Cuiabá Esporte Clube players
Sur SC players
Al-Seeb Club players
Expatriate footballers in Oman
Brazilian expatriate sportspeople in Oman
Expatriate footballers in Thailand
Brazilian expatriate sportspeople in Thailand
Tiago Chulapa
Tiago Chulapa
Tiago Chulapa
Tiago Chulapa
Tiago Chulapa
Tiago Chulapa